The 2019 Women's Ready Steady Tokyo Hockey Tournament was a women's field hockey tournament, consisting of a series of test matches. It was held in Tokyo, Japan, from August 17 to 21, 2019. The tournament served as a test event for the field hockey tournament at the 2020 Summer Olympics. The tournament featured four of the top nations in women's field hockey.

India won the tournament after defeating Japan 2–1 in the final. Australia finished in third place after defeating China 3–1 in the third place playoff.

Competition format
The tournament featured the national teams of Australia, China, India, and the hosts, Japan, competing in a round-robin format, with each team playing each other once. Three points were awarded for a win, one for a draw, and none for a loss.

Squads

Results

Pool stage

Classification stage

Third and fourth place

Final

Statistics

Final standings

Goalscorers

References

Sports competitions in Tokyo
Ready Steady Tokyo Hockey Tournament
International women's field hockey competitions hosted by Japan
Ready Steady Tokyo Hockey Tournament
Ready Steady Tokyo Hockey Tournament
2019 in Tokyo
Hockey